Coaltown Museum is a museum of coalmining, located in Westport on the West Coast of New Zealand.

Building 
The building housing the Coaltown Museum is located in a cultural hub on Palmerston Street. Designed by Boon Goldsmith Bhaskar Brebner Team Architects, the building won two awards in the 2013 New Zealand Institute of Architects Nelson/Marlborough regional awards: the public architecture award and the Resene colour award.

Collection 
The museum was opened in 2013, and holds displays on coal extraction and maritime history. The displays include an eight-ton coal wagon that was used at the Denniston mine; a simulated underground mine and a steam engine from the SS Mawhera. The museum also holds collections of photographs and objects related to mining on the West Coast.

References

History museums in New Zealand
Buildings and structures in the West Coast, New Zealand
2013 establishments in New Zealand
Westport, New Zealand

Local museums in New Zealand